Ioan Rus (born February 21, 1955) is a Romanian politician.

Biography
Born in Urișor, Cluj County, he is a 1982 graduate of the Mechanics faculty of the Technical University of Cluj-Napoca. A member of the Social Democratic Party (PSD) since 1994, he was prefect of his home county in 1995, president of its county council from June to December 2000, Interior Minister from December 2000 to June 2003, and again from May to August 2012, when he resigned in the aftermath of the presidential impeachment referendum.

In June 2014, following the resignation of Dan Șova, he was named Transport Minister. In June 2015, he created a controversy when commenting about Romanians working in Western Europe. He asserted that on a hypothetical monthly salary of €1500, "their children become hoodlums at home and their wives turn into whores". Rus subsequently tendered his resignation.

Notes

Living people
1955 births
People from Cluj County
Romanian engineers
Technical University of Cluj-Napoca alumni
Social Democratic Party (Romania) politicians
Councillors in Romania
Prefects of Romania
Romanian Ministers of Interior
Romanian Ministers of Transport